Iva Ikuko Toguri D'Aquino (July 4, 1916 – September 26, 2006) was a Japanese-American disc jockey and radio personality who participated in English-language radio broadcasts transmitted by Radio Tokyo to Allied troops in the South Pacific during World War II on The Zero Hour radio show.

Toguri called herself "Orphan Ann", but she quickly became inaccurately identified with the name "Tokyo Rose", coined by Allied soldiers and which predated her broadcasts. After the surrender of Japan, Toguri was detained for a year by the United States military before being released for lack of evidence. U.S. Department of Justice officials agreed that her broadcasts were "innocuous", but when Toguri tried to return to the U.S. a popular uproar ensued, prompting the Federal Bureau of Investigation to renew its investigation of Toguri's wartime activities.

She was subsequently charged by the U.S. Attorney's Office with eight counts of treason. Her 1949 trial resulted in a conviction on one count, for which she spent more than six years out of a ten-year sentence in prison. Journalistic and governmental investigators years later pieced together the history of irregularities with the indictment, trial, and conviction, including confessions from key witnesses who had perjured themselves at the various stages of their testimonies. Toguri received a pardon in 1977 from then-U.S. President Gerald Ford.

Early life
Toguri was born in Los Angeles, and was a daughter of Japanese immigrants. Her father, Jun Toguri, had come to the U.S. in 1899, and her mother, Fumi, in 1913. Iva was a Girl Scout, and was raised as a Christian. She began grammar schools in Mexico and San Diego before returning with her family to complete her education in Los Angeles, where she attended Compton High School. Toguri graduated from the University of California, Los Angeles in 1940 with a degree in zoology. In 1940, she registered to vote as a Republican.

On July 5, 1941, Toguri sailed for Japan from the San Pedro, Los Angeles area, to visit an ailing relative. The U.S. State Department issued her a Certificate of Identification; she did not have a passport. In August, Toguri applied to the U.S. Vice Consul in Japan for a passport, stating she wished to return to her home in the U.S. Her request was forwarded to the State Department, but following the attack on Pearl Harbor (December 7, 1941), the State Department refused to certify her citizenship in 1942.

The Zero Hour

Toguri was pressured to renounce her United States citizenship by the Japanese central government with the beginning of American involvement in the Pacific War, like a number of other Americans in Japanese territory. She refused to do so, and was subsequently declared an enemy alien and was refused a war ration card. To support herself, she found work as a typist at a Japanese news agency and eventually worked in a similar capacity for Radio Tokyo.

In November 1943, Allied prisoners of war were forced to broadcast propaganda, and she was selected to host portions of the one-hour radio show The Zero Hour. Her producer was Australian Army Major Charles Cousens, who had pre-war broadcast experience and had been captured at the Fall of Singapore. Cousens had been coerced to work on radio broadcasts, and worked with assistants U.S. Army Captain Wallace Ince and Philippine Army Lieutenant Normando Ildefonso "Norman" Reyes. Toguri had previously risked her life smuggling food into the nearby prisoner of war camp where Cousens and Ince were held, gaining the inmates' trust. Toguri refused to broadcast anti-American propaganda, but she was assured by Major Cousens and Captain Ince that they would not write scripts having her say anything against the United States. True to their word, no such propaganda was found in her broadcasts. In fact, after she went on air in November 1943, she and Cousens tried to make a farce of the broadcasts. The Japanese propaganda officials had little feel for their nuance and double entendres.

Toguri performed in comedy sketches and introduced recorded music, but never participated in any newscasts, with on-air speaking time of generally about 2–3 minutes. She earned only 150 yen per month, or about $7, but she used some of her earnings to feed POWs, smuggling food in as she did before. She aimed most of her comments toward her fellow Americans ("my fellow orphans"), using American slang and playing American music. At no time did Toguri call herself "Tokyo Rose" during the war, and there was no evidence that any other broadcaster had done so. The name was a catch-all used by Allied forces for all of the women who were heard on Japanese propaganda radio and was in general use by the summer of 1943, months prior to Toguri's debut as a broadcast host. Toguri hosted about 340 broadcasts of The Zero Hour under the stage names "Ann" (for "Announcer") and later "Orphan Annie", in reference to the comic strip character Little Orphan Annie.

In April 1945, Toguri married Felipe D'Aquino, a Portuguese citizen of part-Japanese descent she had met at the radio station, and became Iva Toguri D'Aquino.

Postwar arrest and trial

Arrest

After Japan's surrender (August 15, 1945), reporters Harry T. Brundidge of Cosmopolitan Magazine and Clark Lee of Hearst's International News Service (INS) offered $2,000 (the equivalent of a year's wages in Occupied Japan) for an exclusive interview with "Tokyo Rose".

Toguri was in need of money and was still trying to get home, so she stepped forward to accept the offer, but instead found herself arrested on September 5, 1945, in Yokohama. Brundidge reneged on the interview payment and tried to sell his transcript of the interview as Toguri's "confession". She was released after a year in prison when neither the FBI nor General Douglas MacArthur's staff found any evidence that she had aided the Japanese Axis forces. The American and Australian prisoners of war who wrote her scripts told her and the Allied headquarters that she had committed no wrongdoing.

The case history at the FBI's website states, "The FBI's investigation of [D'Aquino's] activities had covered a period of some five years. During the course of that investigation, the FBI had interviewed hundreds of former members of the U.S. Armed Forces who had served in the South Pacific during World War II, unearthed forgotten Japanese documents, and turned up recordings of [D'Aquino's] broadcasts." Investigating with the U.S. Army's Counterintelligence Corps, they "conducted an extensive investigation to determine whether [D'Aquino] had committed crimes against the U.S. By the following October, authorities decided that the evidence then known did not merit prosecution, and she was released".

She requested to return to the United States to have her child born on American soil, but influential gossip columnist and radio host Walter Winchell lobbied against her. Her baby was born in Japan but died shortly after. Following her child's death, D'Aquino was rearrested by the U.S. military authorities and transported to San Francisco on September 25, 1948.

Treason trial

D'Aquino was charged by federal prosecutors with the crime of treason for "adhering to, and giving aid and comfort to, the Imperial Government of Japan during World War II"'. Her trial on eight "overt acts" of treason began on July 5, 1949, at the Federal District Court in San Francisco. It was the costliest and longest trial in American history at the time. D'Aquino was defended by a team of attorneys led by Wayne Mortimer Collins, a prominent advocate of Japanese-American rights. Collins enlisted the help of Theodore Tamba, who became one of D'Aquino's closest friends, a relationship which continued until his death in 1973. One of the defense witnesses was Charles Cousens, who himself had been acquitted of treason by Australian authorities in November 1946.

On September 29, 1949, the jury found D'Aquino guilty on a single charge: Count VI, which stated, "That on a day during October, 1944, the exact date being to the Grand Jurors unknown, said defendant, at Tokyo, Japan, in a broadcasting studio of The Broadcasting Corporation of Japan, did speak into a microphone concerning the loss of ships." She was fined $10,000, given a 10-year prison sentence, and stripped of her citizenship, with Toguri's attorney Collins lambasting the verdict as "Guilty without evidence". She was sent to the Federal Reformatory for Women at Alderson, West Virginia. She was paroled after serving six years and two months, released January 28, 1956, and moved to Chicago, Illinois.

Presidential pardon
The case against D'Aquino was fraught with historic difficulties. Grand jurors had been skeptical of the government's case. Tom DeWolfe, the Special Assistant Attorney General, was "a veteran of radio treason prosecutions" who complained that "it was necessary for me to practically make a fourth of July speech in order to obtain [an] indictment", leading him to urge the Department of Justice to further investigate and so "shore up" the case in Japan. The further work, however, "created new problems for DeWolfe", and soon after D'Aquino was indicted, government witness Hiromu Yagi "admitted that his grand jury testimony was perjured". The FBI's case history notes, "Neither Brundidge nor the [suborned] witness [Hiromu Yagi] testified at trial because of the taint of perjury. Nor was Brundidge prosecuted for subornation of perjury."

In 1976, an investigation by Chicago Tribune reporter Ron Yates discovered that Kenkichi Oki and George Mitsushio, who had given the most damaging testimony at D'Aquino's trial, had perjured themselves. They stated that FBI and U.S. occupation police had coached them for over two months about what they were to say on the stand, and had been threatened with treason trials themselves if they didn't cooperate. This was followed up by a Morley Safer report on the television news program 60 Minutes.

US President Gerald Ford granted a full and unconditional pardon to Iva Toguri D'Aquino in 1977 based on these and earlier issues with the indictment, trial, and conviction,—on January 19, his last full day in office. The decision was supported by a unanimous vote in both houses of the California State Legislature, by the national Japanese American Citizens League, and by S. I. Hayakawa, then a United States senator from California. The pardon restored her U.S. citizenship, which had been abrogated as a result of her conviction.

Later life
In 1980, she reluctantly divorced Felipe, as a result of him being repeatedly denied admission into the United States.

On January 15, 2006, the World War II Veterans Committee awarded Toguri its annual Edward J. Herlihy Citizenship Award, citing "her indomitable spirit, love of country, and the example of courage she has given her fellow Americans". According to one biographer, Toguri found it the most memorable day of her life.

Toguri died of natural causes in a Chicago hospital on September 26, 2006, at the age of 90.

Legacy
Iva Toguri has been the subject of two movies and five documentaries:
 1946: Tokyo Rose, film; directed by Lew Landers. Lotus Long played a heavily fictionalized "Tokyo Rose", described on the film's posters as a "seductive jap traitress"; Byron Barr played the G.I. protagonist who kidnaps the Japanese announcer. Blake Edwards appeared in a supporting part. The film espoused the general public's view of "Tokyo Rose" at the time of Toguri's arrest. The film's character was not referred to by her actual name, but Long was made to look like Toguri.
 1969: The Story of "Tokyo Rose", CBS-TV and WGN radio documentary written and produced by Bill Kurtis.
 1976: Tokyo Rose, CBS-TV documentary segment on 60 Minutes by Morley Safer.
 1995: U.S.A. vs. "Tokyo Rose", self-produced documentary by Antonio A. Montanari Jr., distributed by Cinema Guild.
 1995: Tokyo Rose: Victim of Propaganda, A&E Biography documentary hosted by Jack Perkins and featuring Toguri, Wayne Collins, Jr., Gerald Ford (archive footage), Bill Kurtis, and others.
 1999: Tokyo Rose: Victim of Propaganda, History International, produced by Scott Paddor.
 In 2004, actor George Takei announced that he was working on a film titled Tokyo Rose, American Patriot about Toguri's activities during the war.
 2008: Frank Darabont was slated to direct a new film Tokyo Rose with Darkwoods Productions, which had been planned since 2003.
 On July 20, 2009, History Detectives (Season 7, Episode 705) aired a 20-minute segment entitled Tokyo Rose Recording researched by Gwendolyn Wright tracing the recording of live coverage of Iva Toguri's September 25, 1948 arrival in San Francisco under military escort for trial. The investigation of the origins of this recording documents the involvement of self-serving reporter Harry T. Brundidge and his part in the fraudulent case against her.

See also

 Tokyo Rose, an Allied troops' nickname for female English-speaking broadcasters of Japanese propaganda
 Harold Harby, Los Angeles City Council member, 1939–42, 1943–57, urged the council to keep Tokyo Rose out of the United States
 List of people pardoned or granted clemency by a United States president
 Axis Sally, nickname for female radio personalities who broadcast English-language propaganda on behalf of the European Axis Powers
 Mildred Gillars, one of two radio broadcasters referred to as "Axis Sally" during World War II
 Rita Zucca, one of two radio broadcasters referred to as "Axis Sally" during World War II

References

External links

 
 EarthStation1: Orphan Ann Broadcast Audio
 Mug shots of D'Aquino, thesmokinggun.com
 

1916 births
2006 deaths
20th-century American women
American defectors
American expatriates in Japan
American people of Japanese descent
American radio DJs
American women civilians in World War II
California Republicans
Japan–United States relations
People convicted of treason against the United States
Prisoners and detainees of the United States federal government
Radio personalities from Los Angeles
Recipients of American presidential pardons
Typing
University of California, Los Angeles alumni
American women radio presenters
Radio controversies
Articles containing video clips